Allowed to keep terms (ATKT) is a process in the Indian education system to allow students of pre-graduation and graduation to study in the next grade if they have failed in 1 to 4 subjects. The students must pass the papers they failed before entering into the next grade. For example, if a first-year bachelor's degree student fails to get passing marks in his four subjects, the student must pass those subjects before entering the third year, while the student can study in second year. It has backronyms like Tried and Keep trying.

In some colleges this system is implemented as Supplementary Examinations especially in Engineering Colleges under the Central Government. In general, a student can pass a year with a maximum of 4 supplementary exams. Lets say someone has failed two exams in the first semester and three exams in the second semester, and he could not clear the first semester supplementary exam, he will have to repeat the year and would not be able to attend Third Semester. If someone has got five backlogs in the first semester and he clears one in the supplementary exam of the second semester, if he clears the second semester without any backlog, he will get promoted to 3rd semester but will have to clear the backlogs of the first semester. In most universities you will get three chances to clear any given backlog, Supplementary Exam, Re-Supplementary and Re-Re-Supplementary Exam also called Super-Supplementary Exam as a slang term by the students. At any given "even" semester, if your number of uncleared backlogs is more than four, you would not be promoted to the next year/semester in a Central Government Engineering Institute like IITs, NITs, IIEST etc.

References 

Higher education in India